Fortuna Air Force Station is a closed United States Air Force General Surveillance Radar station. It was closed in 1979 as a radar station, remaining as a Long-Range Radar (LRR) facility until 1984.

Fortuna Air Force Station was part of the last batch of twenty-three radar stations constructed as part of the Air Defense Command permanent network.  It was activated in April, and declared  completely operational in late 1952.

History
The 780th Aircraft Control and Warning Squadron (AC&W Sq) began operations using AN/FPS-3 search and AN/FPS-4 height-finder radars, and initially the station functioned as a Ground-control intercept (GCI) and warning station.  As a GCI station, the squadron's role was to guide interceptor aircraft toward unidentified intruders picked up on the unit's radar scopes.  During 1957 an AN/GPS-3 search radar made a brief appearance. Reportedly, an AN/TPS-10D was also briefly used. In 1958 the 780th began operating an AN/FPS-20A search radar that replaced the AN/GPS-3. By 1960 a pair of AN/FPS-6, -6A handled height-finder chores.

During 1961 Fortuna AFS joined the Semi Automatic Ground Environment (SAGE) system, initially feeding data to DC-20 at Malmstrom Air Force Base, Montana.  After joining, the squadron was redesignated as the 780th Radar Squadron (SAGE) on 1 August 1961. The radar squadron provided information 24/7 to the SAGE Direction Center where it was analyzed to determine range, direction, altitude, speed and whether or not the aircraft were friendly or hostile. Fortuna was incorporated into BUIC I, a manual back-up interceptor control system implemented in 1962. BUIC I provided limited command and control capability in the event the SAGE system was disabled.

In 1963, the AN/FPS-20A was removed, and the makeup of the radars at Fortuna consisted of an AN/FPS-35 search radar along with AN/FPS-6 and AN/FPS-90 height-finder radars.  On 31 July 1963, the site was redesignated as NORAD ID Z-27. The FPS-35 tower was located 6.6 miles from the U.S./Canada border and 8.3 miles from the North Dakota/Montana border.

In 1964 an AN/FPS-26A height-finder radar was installed, and the AN/FPS-6 was retired. In the winter of 1964, a fierce wind storm blew over the AN/FPS-35 sail; the sail was not replaced until the following year (by the one formerly installed at Manassas Air Force Station, Virginia, reportedly). For the interim, in 1965 an AN/FPS-64 search radar was installed in the former AN/FPS-20A tower; it was removed in 1967 after the AN/FPS-35 was again fully operational. The AN/FPS-90 height-finder radar was removed in 1969. Work proceeded on the installation of BUIC II in 1966, after the installation of a Burroughs CSA-51 computer system,  In 1969 it became a BUIC III site.

Over the years, the equipment at the station was upgraded or modified to improve the efficiency and accuracy of the information gathered by the radars.  The 780th Radar Sq was inactivated and replaced by the 780th Air Defense Group in March 1970.   The upgrade to group status was done because of Fortuna AFS' status as a Backup Interceptor Control (BUIC) site. BUIC sites were alternate control sites in the event that SAGE Direction Centers became disabled and unable to control interceptor aircraft. The group was inactivated and replaced by the 780th Radar Squadron. as defenses against manned bombers were reduced.  The group was disbanded in 1984. Normal operations continued until 1979 when Aerospace Defense Command was inactivated in September and the radar station was inactivated.  The GATR site (R-27) was retained until the Joint Surveillance System (JSS) switchover, c. 1984.  The Federal Aviation Administration (FAA) opened an unmanned ARSR-4 radar facility about halfway between Sidney, Montana, and Watford City, North Dakota, (just off of Highway 68) before the Fortuna radars were finally decommissioned in 1984.

Current use 
The station was bought by private investors that stripped the site of anything of value and sold it off.  After this "salvage", the site was forfeited to Divide County over a valuation dispute, and now sits half-demolished, useless as a facility, and abandoned. An environmental impact study is currently planned as a precursor to a possible land reclamation effort.

The main tower is now housing a operating cell tower.

Historical signage was erected by the county, with a turn off on Highway 5. All buildings but the main radar building have been removed.

Buildings and facilities 
Buildings on the station include:

 Recreational Services
 Gymnasium, tennis courts, 2-lane bowling alley, horseshoe pits
 Motor Pool
 Headquarters Building
 Library
 Dining Hall
 Medical Aid Station

 Base Housing
 45 houses
 3 dormitories
 NCO dorm
 6 BOQ (Bachelor Officer Quarters) units
 trailer court (30 units, reduced to 20 in 1974)
 Officer's Lounge ("Hilltop Inn")
 NCO Open Mess

 Radar Towers (FPS-35, FPS-26 w/radome, one inactive)
 Power Plant
 Dental Clinic
 Base Exchange
 Auto Hobby Shop
 Base Theater/Post Office

Air Force units and assignments

Units
 Constituted as the 780th Aircraft Control and Warning Squadron
 Activated on 1 March 1951
 Redesignated 780th Radar Squadron (SAGE) on 1 August 1961
 Inactivated 1 March 1970
 Redesignated 780th Radar Squadron, 1 January 1974
 Activated 17 January 1974
 Inactivated 29 September 1979
 Constituted as the 780th Air Defense Group on 13 February 1970
 Activated on 1 March 1970
 Inactivated on 17 January 1974
 Disbanded on 27 September 1984

Assignments
 545th Aircraft Control and Warning Group, 1 March 1951
 29th Air Division, 6 February 1952
 Minot Air Defense Sector (Manual), 1 January 1961
 Great Falls Air Defense Sector, 25 June 1963
 28th Air Division, 1 April 1966
 24th Air Division, 19 November 1969 - 29 September 1979

Commanders
 Major Phillip J. Acton
 Lt. Col. Glen A. Peebles
 Major Harold E. Daniel
 Major Larry McDonnough
 Major Curtis Yarwood
 780th Radar Squadron
 Major Jack L. Breid, unknown - 1 March 1970
 780th Air Defense Group
 Major Jack L. Breid, 1 March 1970 - unknown

See also

 List of USAF Aerospace Defense Command General Surveillance Radar Stations
 List of United States Air Force aircraft control and warning squadrons

References

Notes

Bibliography

Further Reading
 
 Grant, C.L., The Development of Continental Air Defense to 1 September 1954, (1961), USAF Historical Study No. 126
 
 
 
 Information for Fortuna AFS, ND

External links
Air Defense Radar museum

Installations of the United States Air Force in North Dakota
Buildings and structures in Divide County, North Dakota
Semi-Automatic Ground Environment sites
1952 establishments in North Dakota
1984 disestablishments in North Dakota
Military installations established in 1952
Military installations closed in 1984